Wonderful Life is the debut album by English singer Black (the stage name of Colin Vearncombe). Released in 1987, it peaked at No. 3 on the UK Albums Chart in September of that year.

Three of the songs were co-written with Vearncombe's friend and musical collaborator, keyboardist Dave "Dix" Dickie.

Background
In 1985 Vearncombe wrote the minor key song "Wonderful Life". It was released independently through Ugly Man Records, and got Black noticed by A&M Records who signed Vearncombe and launched his international career. Vearncombe said:
By the end of 1985 I had been in a couple of car crashes, my mother had a serious illness, I had been dropped by a record company, my first marriage went belly-up and I was homeless. Then I sat down and wrote this song called 'Wonderful Life'. I was being sarcastic.

Vearncombe suffered from the feeling of being a one-hit wonder, however, saying later:
Once you have had a hit, it's hard to write another song without having that in the back of your mind. For a long time, I would find myself hearing, 'I like it but it's not Wonderful Life'.

The album's second single "Everything's Coming Up Roses" was also accompanied by a video, but reached only No. 76 in the UK Singles Chart, although also making No. 8 in both the Austrian and German charts. The follow-up "Sweetest Smile", however, became a UK top-10 hit. The third single, a re-release of "Wonderful Life", was a massive hit worldwide. The album of the same name, released in 1987, had similar success, reaping commercial and critical acclaim.

When interviewed in 2013 for superdeluxeedition.com, Vearncome was asked if the album had turned out how he wanted and if the record company had forced producers on him. He replied:
No, we were very, very lucky. You see I’d already been through the mill with Warners and stuff, and then I’d been homeless. There wasn’t much you could scare me with. I was actually homeless when I wrote "Sweetest Smile" and "Wonderful Life," but I was couch-surfing, and nothing touches you when you’re that age. For a while you can get away with it.

Ugly Man Records issue a double-pack single, in September 1986 (Cat. JACK 71D), featuring "Wonderful Life", "Birthday Night", "Sometimes for the Asking" and "Everything's Coming Up Roses".

Track listing

Singles 
The album produced five singles: "Wonderful Life", "I'm Not Afraid" "Everything's Coming Up Roses", "Sweetest Smile" and "Paradise".

Personnel

Musicians

 Colin Vearncombe – vocals, guitar 
 Roy Corkill – fretless bass
 Jimmy Hughes – drums
 Martin Green – saxophone
 Dave "Dix" Dickie – keyboards, programming
 The Creamy Whirls (Tina Labrinski, Sara Lamarra) – backing vocals
 Jimmy Sangster – electric bass
 Doreen Edwards – additional backing vocals
 The Sidwell Brothers – brass section
Source:

Production
Recorded at Powerplant Studios (London), Square One Studio (Bury).
Engineered by Stephen Boyce-Buckley, and Pink Studio (Liverpool).

Charts

Weekly charts

Year-end charts

Sales and certifications

References

External links
 Information at Colin Vearncombe's official website
 
 

1987 debut albums
Black (singer) albums
Albums produced by Robin Millar
A&M Records albums